Hoeflea marina is a Gram-negative, oxidase- and catalase-positive, non-spore-forming, rod-shaped bacteria from the genus of Hoeflea which was isolated from marine environments in Germany. Agrobacterium ferrugineum was reclassified to Hoeflea marina.

References

External links
Type strain of Hoeflea marina at BacDive -  the Bacterial Diversity Metadatabase

Rhizobiaceae
Bacteria described in 2005